Living National Treasure or National Living Treasure may refer to:

Living Human Treasure, a UNESCO designation
National Living Treasure (Australia)
Living National Treasure (Japan)
List of Living National Treasures of Japan (crafts)
National Living Treasure (Philippines)
Living National Treasure (South Korea)